The Portuguese Democratic Movement/Democratic Electoral Commissions (Portuguese: Movimento Democrático Português / Comissões Democráticas Eleitorais, MDP/CDE or just MDP) was one of the most important organizations of the democratic opposition to the Estado Novo. It was founded in 1969 as an electoral coalition meant to run in the non-democratic and widely manipulated parliamentary election.

History

In 1973 the MDP took part in the Democratic Congress of Aveiro, the largest meeting of democratic militants during the dictatorship. After the Carnation Revolution in 1974, it was made part of every provisional government, with exception of the 6th and in 1979 it ran in coalition with the Portuguese Communist Party in the FEPU and later in APU, achieving important electoral results.

In 1986, disagreements with the PCP arose, the coalition was dissolved and the MDP was later disbanded. A fraction formed the political association Democratic Intervention (Portuguese: Intervenção Democrática) and another group formed a new party, the Politics XXI (Portuguese: Política XXI) that now is part of the Left Bloc.

References

Political parties established in 1969
Political parties disestablished in 1987
Defunct socialist parties in Portugal
1969 establishments in Portugal